Matthijs Hardijk (born 25 December 1997) is a Dutch football player. He plays for ACV Assen.

Club career
He made his Eerste Divisie debut for Jong AZ on 18 August 2017 in a game against FC Den Bosch.

References

External links
 

1997 births
People from Hoogezand-Sappemeer
Living people
Dutch footballers
Eerste Divisie players
Association football forwards
Jong AZ players
FC Groningen players
Harkemase Boys players
Asser Christelijke Voetbalvereniging players
Footballers from Groningen (province)